This was the first edition of the tournament.

Jamie Murray and Neal Skupski won the title after defeating Austin Krajicek and Artem Sitak 6–7(2–7), 7–5, [10–6] in the final.

Seeds

Draw

External links
 Main draw

Arizona Tennis Classic - Doubles
Sports competitions in Phoenix, Arizona